Currently the Inner Mongolia Autonomous Region does not have an official flag. The flag of the Inner Mongolian People's Party is used by Mongolians who support Inner Mongolian independence.

Flags

Flag of the Inner Mongolian People's Party

The Mongolian People's Party uses a blue flag with a Soyombo symbol — red fire, a yellow circle and a white crescent. The blue background symbolizes the Eternal Blue Heaven which Mongolians believe in. The red fire simply symbolizes fire. The yellow circle symbolises sun and the white crescent symbolizes moon.

Flag of the Mongolian Liberal Union

The Mongolian Liberal Union Party uses a triband of blue and white with a blue compass cross similar to one in the Flag of NATO.

Historical flags

See also
 Flag of Tibet
 Flag of Mongolia
 Inner Mongolian independence movement
 Flag of Mengjiang

References
1. https://www.crwflags.com/fotw/flags/cn-impp.html#impp

Flags of Asia
Inner Mongolia
Mongolian People's Party